Waqraqucha (Quechua waqra horn, qucha lake, "horn lake", also spelled Huacracocha) is a mountain in the Cordillera Central in the Andes of Peru at a small lake of that name which reaches a height of approximately . It is located in the Junín Region, Jauja Province, on the border of the districts of Curicaca and Pomacancha, and in the Yauli Province, Chacapalpa District.

References 

Mountains of Peru
Mountains of Junín Region
Lakes of Peru
Lakes of Junín Region